William van Cutsem (8 September 1935 – 14 May 2018), better known by his pen name William Vance, was a Belgian comics artist known for his distinctive realistic style and work in Franco-Belgian comics.

Biography 
William van Cutsem was born in Anderlecht near Brussels in 1935. After his military service in 1955–1956, he studied for four years at the Académie Royale des Beaux-Arts in Brussels. Originally from Flanders, he worked most of his life in France, and moved later to Santander, Spain.

William Vance started drawing for the Franco-Belgian comics magazine Tintin in 1962. After drawing complete real-life stories of four pages for a few years, he started work on his first series, Howard Flynn, written by Yves Duval. Three albums followed, before he created other short-lived series such as the Western Ringo and Roderik. His first success followed with the series about secret agent Bruno Brazil, written by Tintins editor-in-chief Greg, as one of the comics that started the revival and repositioning of Tintin as a more adult-oriented magazine.
From 1967 on, he continued the stories of Bob Morane in Femmes d'aujourd'hui, a magazine aimed at adult women. This science fiction series, based on the novels by Henri Vernes, was started by Dino Attanasio and continued by Gerald Forton before Vance took over and made it a success. Between 1969 and 1979, 18 albums with his artwork were published. A few years later, the series moved to Tintin as well, and Vance was succeeded by his brother-in-law, Felicisimo Coria.

Vance meanwhile started two new series, Ramiro, with stories set in medieval Spain, and from 1976 onwards, Bruce J. Hawker, his personal favourite, starring a lieutenant in the Royal Navy.

His final breakthrough and largest commercial success came in 1984, when writer Jean Van Hamme proposed a new series, XIII. First serialised in Spirou magazine, this series of contemporary adventures with action, violence, and complicated intrigues, let Vance draw upon his talent for realistic drawings, action scenes and exotic settings. By 2007, he had drawn 18 albums in the series, which sold more than 14 million copies in more than 20 countries, and was twice adapted into a TV series. The series was coloured by his wife Petra Coria, with whom he lived in Santander, Spain.

In 2010, Vance announced his retirement due to Parkinson's disease. He died of the disease on 14 May 2018.

Style
Vance worked in a highly detailed realistic style which has been described as "precise and nervous", an "inimitable" style resembling no other author. An article in Der Tagesspiegel discussing his series Bruno Brazil called his early work already "meticulous" and "sophisticated", but describes how in the early 1970s it drifted away from the more typical realistic style common in Belgian comics at the time, and became influenced by Dutch comics artist Hans G. Kresse. He also started experimenting with the page layout, with large central panels, and with the colouring, which showed influences of psychedelic art.

Awards
 2005: Bronzen Adhemar in Turnhout, Belgium
 2009: Honorary citizen of the City of Brussels

Bibliography
These are the comic albums drawn by William Vance published until 2007. Between 2001 and 2011 most of his older work was republished in Tout Vance by Le Lombard and by Dargaud.

Notes

Sources

 William Vance publications in BelgianTintin and French Tintin, Spirou, BoDoï BDoubliées

External links
 Belgian Comic Book Artist William Vance Dies

1935 births
2018 deaths
Belgian comics artists
People from Anderlecht
Neurological disease deaths in Spain
Deaths from Parkinson's disease